Jerome Michael Segal (born November 25, 1943) is an American philosopher and political activist, who resides in Silver Spring, Maryland. He was the founder of the socialist Bread and Roses Party, which achieved ballot access in Maryland, and which Segal ran from 2018 to 2021.

Segal is a research scholar at the University of Maryland, College Park, and the president of the Jewish Peace Lobby. He was a candidate in the Democratic Party primary in the 2018 United States Senate election in Maryland. He unsuccessfully ran in the 2020 United States presidential election and the 2022 Maryland gubernatorial election.

On July 25, 2022, Segal started a campaign for the Democratic presidential nomination in the 2024 United States presidential election.

Early life and education
Segal was born and raised in The Bronx. His father, a socialist and member of the Jewish Labor Bund, was born in Poland and immigrated to the United States, where he found employment as a factory worker in the garment industry. After graduating from the Bronx High School of Science, Segal went to City College of New York, where he received honors in philosophy and economics, and was awarded the Brittain Prize in Moral Philosophy. Segal went on to receive a PhD from the University of Michigan, and taught in the philosophy department of the University of Pennsylvania. He later received an MPA from the Hubert Humphrey School of the University of Minnesota.

Career
After receiving his MPA from the University of Minnesota, Segal moved to Washington, D.C. in 1974 to work as an aide to Congressman Donald M. Fraser and administrator of the House Budget Committee's task force on distributive impacts of economic policy. In 1979, he became Coordinator for the Near East in the policy bureau of the US Agency for International Development and, later, Senior Advisor for Agency Planning. After leaving government, he joined the Institute for Philosophy and Public Policy at the University of Maryland as Senior Research Scholar.

Segal has been a leader of the American Jewish peace movement, starting in 1982 with Washington Area Jews for Israeli-Palestinian Peace (WAJIPP), a group that opposed the Israeli invasion of Lebanon. In 1987, he traveled to Tunis to meet Yasser Arafat and leaders of the Palestine Liberation Organization. No American Jewish delegation had ever met with the PLO, which the U.S. government officially considered a terrorist organization at the time. In August 1988, Israel raided the offices of Faisal al-Husseini, a Palestinian militant, and discovered a plan, based in part on earlier writings by Segal, for a ''declaration of Palestinian independence." That plan, along with other writings by Segal in Palestinian papers such as Al-Quds, were a catalyst for the Palestinian Declaration of Independence later that year and the Palestinian peace initiative in which Israel's right to exist was recognized.

In May 1989, Segal founded the Jewish Peace Lobby, which he envisioned as acting as a counterweight to the American Israel Public Affairs Committee (AIPAC). The Peace Lobby remains active today, with about 5,000 members (including 400 rabbis).

As a candidate

In 2018, Segal founded a new socialist political party called "Bread and Roses", after raising the requisite 10,000 signatures needed by the Maryland Board of Elections. The party is named after a slogan used by striking workers during the 1912 Lawrence textile strike. Segal ran for a seat in the US Senate against Ben Cardin in the 2018 midterm elections. After losing in the Democratic primary to Cardin, he attempted to be included in the general election under the Bread and Roses party, but was prohibited due to the "sore loser" statute of Maryland state law, which prohibits candidates from running in the general election after losing a primary. After the 2018 election, Segal submitted a petition with more than 15,000 signatures to the Maryland Board of Elections. The Board certified the Bread and Roses party in January 2019, allowing its candidates to run for office in Maryland in the 2020 election.

In August 2019, Segal ran in the 2020 United States presidential election under the Bread and Roses party banner. He said that he would not compete in swing states to avoid taking votes from a Democratic candidate running against Donald Trump.

The Bread and Roses party identified itself as "socialistic" in nature, distinguishing itself from "traditional socialism". The party advocated socialist ideals such as "From each according to his abilities, to each according to his needs" while also advocating democratic principles of limited government, individual liberty and rule of law. Their website also advertised ideals like "plain living, high thinking and a Utopian future".

In December 2021, Segal disbanded the Bread and Roses party to seek the Democratic nomination for the 2022 Maryland gubernatorial election. His running mate was Justin Dispenza, a member of the town council of Galena, Maryland. After conceding in the Democratic primary on July 20, 2022, Segal started a campaign for 2024 United States presidential election.

Books
Creating the Palestinian State
Agency and Alienation
Negotiating Jerusalem
Graceful Simplicity
Joseph's Bones
Agency, Illusion, and Well-Being

References

External links

 Dr. Jerome M. Segal

20th-century American Jews
1943 births
20th-century American philosophers
21st-century American philosophers
Activists from Maryland
American people of Polish-Jewish descent
American political activists
American political candidates
Candidates in the 2018 United States Senate elections
City College of New York alumni
Jewish philosophers
Jewish socialists
Living people
Maryland Democrats
Maryland socialists
Politicians from the Bronx
People from Silver Spring, Maryland
Philosophers from Maryland
Simple living advocates
University of Maryland, College Park faculty
University of Michigan alumni
Humphrey School of Public Affairs alumni
University of Pennsylvania faculty
The Bronx High School of Science alumni
Writers from New York City
Candidates in the 2020 United States presidential election
21st-century American Jews
Candidates in the 2022 United States elections
Candidates in the 2024 United States presidential election